Rod Laver and Roy Emerson defeated Ken Rosewall and Fred Stolle 6–4, 6–4 in the final to win the men's doubles title at the 1969 Australian Open. Dick Crealy and Allan Stone were the defending champions but lost in the Quarterfinals to Laver and Emerson.

Seeds

  John Newcombe /  Tony Roche (semifinals)
  Ken Rosewall /  Fred Stolle (final)
  Rod Laver /  Roy Emerson (champions)
  Raymond Moore /  Marty Riessen (semifinals)
  Andrés Gimeno /  Richard Pancho Gonzales (second round)
  Mal Anderson /  Roger Taylor (second round)
  Dick Crealy /  Allan Stone (quarterfinals)
  Terry Addison /  Ray Keldie (quarterfinals)

Draw

Finals

Section 1

Section 2

External links
 1969 Australian Open – Men's draws and results at the International Tennis Federation

Men's Doubles
Australian Open (tennis) by year – Men's doubles